{{DISPLAYTITLE:x2 Centauri}}

x2 Centauri is a star located in the constellation Centaurus. It is also known by its designations HD 108114 and HR 4724. The apparent magnitude of the star is about 5.7, meaning it is only visible to the naked eye under excellent viewing conditions. Its distance is about 440 light-years (140 parsecs), based on its parallax measured by the Hipparcos astrometry satellite.

x2 Centauri's spectral type is B9IV/V, meaning it is a late B-type main sequence star or subgiant. These types of stars are a few times more massive than the Sun, and have effective temperatures of about 10,000 to 30,000 K. x2 Centauri has a temperature of about 11,500 K. The star x1 Centauri, which lies about 0.4′ away from x2 Centauri, may or may not form a physical binary star system with x2 Centauri, as the two have similar proper motions and distances.

References 

Centaurus (constellation)
B-type subgiants
Centauri, x2
060610
108114
4724
CD-34 08146